Jay B. Rising served as the 42nd Treasurer of Michigan.

Education
Rising earned an undergraduate degree from the University of Michigan and a J.D. degree from Wayne State University Law School.

Career
Rising served Chief Deputy Michigan State Treasurer as Deputy Michigan State Treasurer for Policy Development and Finance from 1983 to 1991. Rising first joined the law firm Miller, Canfield, Paddock and Stone in 1991. He worked for this firm until 1998. On January 6, 2003, Rising was appointed by Governor Jennifer Granholm to the position of Michigan State Treasurer. Rising served in this position until late February 2006, when he was offered the positions of vice president and chief financial officer at Detroit Medical Center.

References

Living people
Michigan lawyers
State treasurers of Michigan
University of Michigan alumni
Wayne State University alumni
20th-century American lawyers
21st-century American politicians
Year of birth missing (living people)